Cunigunda of Sulichgau (893-924) was the daughter of Ermentrude of France, daughter in turn of Louis the Stammerer. Her father was Eberhard of Sulichgau, son of Unruoch III. In 898 her uncle Charles III gained control as king of the Franks, changing Cunigunda's life for the better.

Family 
To gain greater affinity with the nobles of Lotharingia, King Charles III arranged the marriage of Cunigunda in 909 with the powerful Wigeric of Lotharingia (890-919). Their children were:

 Frederick I (d. 978), who was count of Bar and duke of Upper Lorraine
 Adalberon I (d. 962), elected bishop of Metz in 929
 Gilbert (d. 964), count in the Ardennes
 Sigebert, mentioned in 942.
 Liutgarde, who married Adalbert, Count of Metz, then Eberhard IV, count of Nordgau.
 Gozlin, Count of Bidgau (d. 942), married to Oda of Metz and father of Godfrey I, Count of Verdun.
 Siegfried, count of Luxembourg. 

Around 922, she married Ricwin, Count of Verdun (d. 923).

References

890s births
10th-century deaths
10th-century French people
10th-century French women